K-9000 is a 1991 American science fiction crime action television film starring Chris Mulkey, Catherine Oxenberg, Dennis Haysbert, and Judson Scott. It is the second installment in the K-9 film series, originally intended to serve as a pilot episode for a television series that was based on and serves as a spin-off of K-9. It was directed by Kim Manners and written by Michael Part and Steven E. de Souza.

Plot
Dr. Aja Turner (Catherine Oxenberg), a beautiful female scientist, implants a computer in a German Shepherd's brain to help it track and capture criminals. Crooks, led by Anton Zeiss (Judson Earney Scott), make off with the cybernetic canine. Dr. Turner teams up with Eddie Monroe (Chris Mulkey), a hard-nosed policeman who is implanted with a microchip allowing him to communicate with the dog.

Cast

 Chris Mulkey as Detective Eddie Monroe
 Catherine Oxenberg as Dr. Aja Turner
 Dennis Haysbert as Nick Sanrio
 Dana Gladstone as Captain DeLillo
 Jerry Houser as Niner (voice)
 Judson Earney Scott as Anton Zeiss
 Anne Haney as Mrs. Wiffington
 Tom McFadden as Banks

References

External links

1991 television films
1991 films
1991 crime thriller films
American crime thriller films
Fox network original films
American science fiction television films
Films about dogs
1990s English-language films
1990s science fiction films
Television pilots not picked up as a series
Films with screenplays by Steven E. de Souza
Films produced by Steven E. de Souza
1990s American films